Matheus Tobias Leist (born September 8, 1998) is a Brazilian racing driver who last raced for JDC-Miller MotorSports in the WeatherTech SportsCar Championship.

Career

Karting
Leist began karting in 2009 at the age of eleven. In 2013, he finished as runner-up in the Petrobras Karting Championship.

Lower formulas
In 2014, Leist graduated to single-seaters, racing in the B class of the Brazilian F3 Championship, finishing runner-up to Vitor Baptista.

The following year, Leist switched to MSA Formula in Britain with Double R Racing. He scored two victories and finished fifth in the standings.

British F3
In 2016, Leist reunited with Double R Racing and graduated to BRDC British F3. Scoring four wins, two poles and six fastest laps, Leist took the title at the final round after a close fight with Ricky Collard throughout the season.

GP3 Series
In November 2016, it was announced Leist would partake in the GP3 post-season test at Yas Marina with ART Grand Prix, Arden International and Trident Racing.

Indy Lights
In February 2017, Leist signed with Carlin for the Indy Lights Championship. During his first season, Leist picked up his first podium at the Grand Prix of Indianapolis before taking pole and winning the Freedom 100 less than two weeks later, having led from start to finish.

IndyCar Series 
In November 2017, A.J. Foyt Enterprises announced that the team hired Leist to drive the No. 4 Chevrolet in 2018. Leist partners veteran Brazilian driver Tony Kanaan and made his IndyCar debut at the Firestone Grand Prix of St. Petersburg on March 11, 2018.

Racing record

Career summary

American open-wheel racing
(key) (Races in bold indicate pole position; races in italics indicate fastest lap)

Indy Lights

IndyCar Series
(key)

* Season still in progress.

Indianapolis 500

WeatherTech SportsCar Championship results
(key) (Races in bold indicate pole position; results in italics indicate fastest lap)

References

External links

1998 births
Living people
People from Novo Hamburgo
Brazilian people of German descent
Brazilian racing drivers
MRF Challenge Formula 2000 Championship drivers
Brazilian IndyCar Series drivers
British F4 Championship drivers
BRDC British Formula 3 Championship drivers
Indy Lights drivers
IndyCar Series drivers
Indianapolis 500 drivers
Brazilian WeatherTech SportsCar Championship drivers
Carlin racing drivers
Sportspeople from Rio Grande do Sul
Hitech Grand Prix drivers
Double R Racing drivers
JDC Motorsports drivers
A. J. Foyt Enterprises drivers
Brazilian Formula Three Championship drivers